Valma Bass (born 12 March 1974) is a former sprinter from the United States Virgin Islands who specialized in the 100 and 200 metres. She changed nationality from Saint Kitts and Nevis in May 2003.

For her old country she competed at the Olympic Games in 1996 and 2000 as well as the 2001 World Championships. She later competed at the 2003 World Championships and the 2004 World Indoor Championships. At none of these occasions she reached the final. She does have an eighth-place finish from the 2006 Central American and Caribbean Games.

Her personal best times are 11.43 seconds in the 100 metres and 23.07 seconds in the 200 metres, both achieved in May 2000 in Baton Rouge. These times used to be the Saint Kitts and Nevis records, but they have been broken by Virgil Hodge. Bass still co-holds the Saint Kitts and Nevis record in 4 x 400 metres relay, which was achieved at the 1996 Olympic Games.

References

1974 births
Living people
Saint Kitts and Nevis emigrants to the United States Virgin Islands
United States Virgin Islands female sprinters
Saint Kitts and Nevis female sprinters
Athletes (track and field) at the 1996 Summer Olympics
Athletes (track and field) at the 2000 Summer Olympics
Athletes (track and field) at the 2003 Pan American Games
Olympic athletes of Saint Kitts and Nevis
Pan American Games competitors for the United States Virgin Islands
Olympic female sprinters
21st-century American women